John William Shepherd (born November 18, 1960) is an American actor and producer who has starred in film and on television since the 1980s.

Career 
He is best known for his role in the 1985 horror film Friday the 13th: A New Beginning as Tommy Jarvis and speaks in the commentary of the deluxe edition DVD of the film in 2009. He also appeared in one episode of Friday the 13th TV series.

Other movies he starred in were the 1992 movie Deep Cover and in the 1996 comedy film Down Periscope with Kelsey Grammer. His most recent role was in the 2000 movie Bobby Jones: Stroke of Genius. Shepherd has made guest appearances on TV shows such as Quantum Leap, Tour of Duty, Friday the 13th: The Series, and T.J. Hooker.

John Shepherd is a producer of such films as The Ultimate Gift, Bobby Jones: Stroke of Genius, Snowmen, The Stoning of Soraya M., and co-executive producer of Bella.

Filmography
  Friday the 13th: A New Beginning (1985) – Tommy Jarvis
  Thunder Run (1986) – Chris
 Caught (1987) – Tim Devon
  Banzai Runner (1987) – Beck Baxter
 Hot Paint (1988)
 Frank Nitti: The Enforcer (1988)
  The Hunt for Red October (1990) – Foxtrot Pilot
  The Heroes of Desert Storm (1991)
  Deep Cover (1992) – Undercover Cop (uncredited)
  Down Periscope (1996) – Young Sailor
 The Ride (1997) – Staff #1
  Bless the Child (2000) – Mr. Czernik
  The Climb (2002) – Pastor
  Bobby Jones: Stroke of Genius (2004) – Bob Woodruff

Television 
  The Phantom of the Open Hearth (1978) – Young Ralph Parker
  California Fever (1979) – Don
  240-Robert (1981) – Chris
  The Other Victim (1981) – Steve Langford
  T.J. Hooker (1982) – David Wagner
  Confessions of a Married Man (1983) – Tom
  Close Ties (1983) – Thayer
  The Kidnapping of Baby John Doe (1987) – Friend as Party
  Friday the 13th: The Series (1988) – Constable
  High Mountain Rangers (1988)
  I'll Be Home for Christmas (1988) – Greg
  Tour of Duty (1989) – Specialist Taft
  The Equalizer (1989) – Michael Gianelli
  Quantum Leap (1990) – Thomas
  Road to Avonlea (1990) – Henry
  Rock Hudson (1990) – Captain of 'Fighter Squadron'
  Shannon's Deal (1990) 
  Mark Twain and Me (1991) – Oxford Dean

External links

1960 births
American male film actors
American male television actors
Living people
People from Glen Ellyn, Illinois